"The Art of Letting Go" is a 2013 song by American singer-songwriter Mariah Carey.

The Art of Letting Go may also refer to:

 "The Art of Letting Go", a song by Pat Benatar from Seven the Hard Way
 "The Art of Letting Go", a song by Mikaila from Mikaila
 "The Art of Letting Go", a song by the Stone Temple Pilots from Stone Temple Pilots (2018)